James H. Harris (1828 – January 28, 1898) was a Union Army soldier during the American Civil War. He earned the highest military decoration in the United States—the Medal of Honor—for his actions at the Battle of Chaffin's Farm. He was African American.

Biography
Born in Saint Mary's County, Maryland, Harris worked as a farmer before joining the U.S. Army from Great Mills at age 36. He enlisted on February 14, 1864, as a private in Company B of the 38th United States Colored Troops regiment. He was promoted to corporal five months later, on July 25, and to sergeant two months after that, on September 10.

At the Battle of Chaffin's Farm, on September 29, 1864, Harris' regiment was among a division of black troops assigned to attack the center of the Confederate defenses at New Market Heights. The defenses consisted of two lines of abatis and one line of palisades manned by Brigadier General John Gregg's Texas Brigade. The attack was met with intense Confederate fire; over fifty percent of the black troops were killed, captured, or wounded. The initial attack stalled at the abatis, but when a renewed effort began, Harris and two other men of the 38th USCT, Private William H. Barnes and Sergeant Edward Ratcliff, ran at the head of the assault. Being the first to breach the defenses, the three soldiers engaged the Confederates in hand-to-hand combat. They were soon joined by the remainder of their division, and the Confederate force was routed.

Over seven years later, on February 18, 1874, he was issued the Medal of Honor for "[g]allantry in the assault" at Chaffin's Farm. Harris died at the approximate age of 69 and was buried at Arlington National Cemetery in Arlington County, Virginia.

Medal of Honor citation
Rank and organization: Sergeant, Company B, 38th U.S. Colored Troops. Place and date: At New Market Heights, Va., September 29, 1864. Entered service at:------. Birth: St. Marys County, Md. Date of issue: February 18, 1874.

Citation:

Gallantry in the assault.

United States Colored Troops Memorial Statue

James H. Harris is specifically honored and memorialized by the United States Colored Troops Memorial Statue in Lexington Park, Maryland (in St. Mary's County, where he grew up and also worked as a farmer). The informational kiosk at the memorial mentions him specifically.

See also

List of American Civil War Medal of Honor recipients: G–L
List of African American Medal of Honor recipients
Battle of Chaffin's Farm
38th Regiment United States Colored Troops 
United States Colored Troops

Notes

References

External links

1828 births
1898 deaths
People from St. Mary's County, Maryland
People of Maryland in the American Civil War
African Americans in the American Civil War
Union Army soldiers
United States Army Medal of Honor recipients
Burials at Arlington National Cemetery
American Civil War recipients of the Medal of Honor